Claudiu Dorin Tudor (born 29 April 1985) is a Romanian retired footballer who is the president of Liga I club Petrolul Ploiești.

He played as a midfielder for teams such as Petrolul Ploiești, FC Universitatea Craiova, Juventus București, Astra Ploiești or Studențesc Iași, among others.

Career

Petrolul Ploiești
Claudiu Tudor made his debut in Divizia B at the age of just 17 for Petrolul Ploiești.

Universitatea Craiova
In 2002, he moved to Universitatea Craiova. Not making an impact, he was loaned to Sheriff Tiraspol and Juventus București.

Astra Ploiești
He moved to Astra Ploiești in 2009 and helped them gain promotion to the liga I. Later that year he damaged his Achilles tendon and was sidelined for almost a year due to that injury.

Politehnica Iași
In January 2011 he moved to Politehnica Iași, becoming captain of the team after just six months. At the end of the 11–12 season, CSMS Iași gained promotion to the Liga I, as Tudor scored three goals from 27 games.

Honours
Sheriff Tiraspol
Divizia Națională: 2004–05
Moldovan Super Cup: 2004

Studențesc Iași
Liga II: 2011–12

UTA Arad
Liga III: 2014–15

Petrolul Ploiești
Liga III: 2017–18
Liga IV – Prahova County: 2016–17

References

External links
 
 

1985 births
Living people
Sportspeople from Ploiești
Romanian footballers
Association football forwards
Romania youth international footballers
Liga I players
Liga II players
Liga III players
FC Petrolul Ploiești players
FC U Craiova 1948 players
ASC Daco-Getica București players
FC Astra Giurgiu players
FC Politehnica Iași (2010) players
FC UTA Arad players
CS Afumați players
AS Voința Snagov players
Moldovan Super Liga players
FC Sheriff Tiraspol players
Romanian expatriate footballers
Expatriate footballers in Moldova
Romanian expatriate sportspeople in Moldova